Bishop Paschang Catholic School is a government-aided, whole day Roman Catholic coeducational primary school located in Kowloon Bay, Kowloon, Hong Kong.

The school is in Primary One Admission Net 46 of Kwun Tong. With the exception of English and Mandarin lessons, the school employs Cantonese as the main medium of instruction, in line with the prevailing education policy set by the Hong Kong government. This school is generally considered as the best primary school in the area of Kowloon Bay and Ngau Tau Kok. The sponsoring body is the Catholic Foreign Mission Society of America, commonly known as the Maryknoll Fathers.

History
The school was founded by the Maryknoll Fathers in 1969. The Bishop Walsh School was founded by the Maryknoll Fathers in Hong Kong in 1963. When Bishop Paschang Memorial School was set up in 1969, some senior staff were transferred from Bishop Walsh School.

Timeline
 1969 founded – Bishop Paschang Catholic School was formerly known as the "Bishop Paschang Memorial School", originally located in Lower Ngau Tau Kok Estate. It was founded by John M. McLoughlin. Initially, there was one morning section and onea evening section. McLoughlin named the school after Maryknoller Adolph John Paschang.
 1971 – First Primary 6 graduation of the morning section
 1972 – First Primary 6 graduation of the evening section
 1975 – First batch of pupils who studied from P1 up to P6 graduated in 1975
 1979 – 10th anniversary
 1999 – Parents-Teachers Association founded
 2002 – Morning section of Bishop Paschang Memorial School moved to the campus in Kowloon Bay, became a full day school and was renamed Bishop Paschang Catholic School. The new campus was situated next to Richland Gardens, opposite the Kai Yip Estate, of Y2K design by the Architectural Services Department of HKSAR government. PM section of Bishop Paschang Memorial School stayed in Ngau Tau Kok but became a full day school.
 2003 – SARS outbreak in Amoy Gardens, Ngau Tau Kok. 
 2006 – Incorporated Management Committee founded according to the Section 40BU of the Education Ordinance
 2007 – Alumni Association founded
 2008 – All remaining classes of Bishop Paschang Memorial School were relocated to Bishop Paschang Catholic School in Kowloon Bay. A 39th anniversary special memorial booklet commemorated this event. The campus in Ngau Tau Kok was returned to the HKSAR government and was subsequently demolished together with the rest of the Lower Ngau Tau Kok Estate. The migration was complete. The newer campus was opened to the public on 8 March and 20 July 2008. Lower Ngau Tau Kok Estate was the last of its kind of resettlement estate built by the Hong Kong Government. Its demolition aroused much nostalgia.

Description
Bishop Paschang Catholic School is a government aided school, started to adopt small class teaching. Starting from 2010, the school enrolled five primary one classes, totalling 125 pupils each year. Most pupils are from neighbourhood families. As of 2011 enrolment had reached about 800 pupils. Graduates became doctors, lawyers, accountants, pharmacists, professors, principals, teachers, professional athletes, actors, administrative officers and engineers.

The school employed an expert in curriculum design, Chan Mei Hing, in 2009 to succeed the retiring headmaster, Au Wing Cheung. Besides the supervisor and the headmistress, the Incorporated Management Committee (2010–2012) consisted of Fr. Thomas A. Peyton, Joseph Lai, Lee Ping Hing, Au Wing Cheung, Martin Lai, Rosa Chan, Priscilla Ko, Stefy Wong, Yip Miu Yee, and K.F. Chan.

Supervisors
 John M. McLoughlin (1969–1980)
 Peter Alphonsus Reilly (1980–1994)
 Howard D. Trube (1994–1995)
 Thomas Anthony Peyton (1995–2004)
 Anthony Vincent Brennan (2004 – 2012)
 Martin Lai Wing-chun

Headmasters
Headmasters of Bishop Paschang Memorial School AM Section in Ngau Tau Kok
Chan Man Wai (1969–1984)
Yeung Yuen Man (1984–1992)
Leung Kwok Hung (1992–2001)
Lee Ping Hing (2001–2002)
AM section moved to Kowloon Bay in 2002 and became a full day school.

Headmasters of Bishop Paschang Memorial School PM Section in Ngau Tau Kok
Lau Neng Chung (1969–1976)
Lee Tai Chung (1976–1991)
Leung Kwok Hung (1991–1992)
Sun Leung Shek (1992–1996)
Lee Ping Hing (1996–2001)
Au Wing Cheung (2001–2002)
PM section of Bishop Paschang Memorial School became full day school in 2002.

Headmasters of Bishop Paschang Memorial School Full Day School in Ngau Tau Kok
Au Wing Cheung (2002–2006)
Au Suk Yan (2006–2008)
Full day school of Bishop Paschang Memorial School was merged with Bishop Paschang Catholic School in Kowloon Bay in 2008.

Headmasters of Bishop Paschang Catholic School in Kowloon Bay 
Lee Ping Hing (2002–2006)
Au Wing Cheung (2006–2009)
Chan Mei Hing (2009–2021)
Tong Kwok Man (2021–)

The school places high importance on moral education and participated in the "Marathon 101 Education Program". In 2009, they invited the blind marathon winner Henry Wanyoike and his leading runner Joseph Kibunja to the school to share with pupils their labour.

Curriculum
The school places priority on both Chinese and English learning. The school promotes English reading throughout, aiming at improving language skills. The school participated in the SCOLAR English Language Camp for Primary 4 Students in 2002. The school uses Mandarin Chinese in all Chinese lessons from P1 to P3.

Facilities
The campus in Kowloon Bay is of Year 2000 design by the Architectural Services Department of the Hong Kong SAR government, the current standard design for school buildings.

Extracurricular activities
The school has various extra-curricular activities. The Bishop Paschang Catholic School Alumni Association awards an "A life body skill" scholarship to those pupils with outstanding performance in sports and arts.

Supporting bodies
Bishop Paschang Catholic School Parent-Teacher Association was founded in 1999. Bishop Paschang Catholic School Alumni Association was founded in 2007. Through the years the alumni association accepted graduates of all years from both Ngau Tau Kok and Kowloon Bay campus. These two supporting bodies help the school in organising activities and award scholarships.

School Song
The founding headmaster, Chan Man Wai, invited Taiwaneesee classical music composer, Huang You Di, to compose the school song. Lyrics were written by Lee Shi Shou, the father of the second headmaster of Bishop Paschang Memorial School PM section.

The pair also composed the school song of Bishop Walsh Memorial School.

Notable alumni
Ho Ka Lai – former Hong Kong fencing team member
Poon Man Tik – former Hong Kong soccer team member
POON Man Chun – younger brother of Poon Man Tik, also a former Hong Kong soccer team member
Myolie Wu – Hong Kong TV actress
Lee Wai-sze –  Hong Kong cycling team member (2010 Guangzhou Asia Games Gold Medalist)

Old pictures

See also
 Maryknoll

References

External links
Official web page of Bishop Paschang Catholic School

Maryknoll schools
Roman Catholic primary schools in Hong Kong
Ngau Tau Kok
Kowloon Bay